Wurzerstraße is one of the four underground stations on the Bad Godesberg branch served by both Cologne and Bonn Stadtbahn. This station is served by line 16, 63 and 67. Because the Bad Godesberg underground stations have 4-main color tiles, the Wurzerstraße have red tiles.

References

Cologne-Bonn Stadtbahn stations